Howard Darryl Leigh, Baron Leigh of Hurley (born 3 April 1959) is a British businessman, Conservative Party politician, and since September 2013 a member of the House of Lords. He is the Co-founder and Senior Partner of Cavendish Corporate Finance.

Leigh was created a life peer on 16 September 2013 taking the title Baron Leigh of Hurley, of Hurley in the Royal County of Berkshire.

Life 
Leigh attended Clifton College in Bristol. From 1977 to 1980 he studied Economics at the University of Southampton. After completing his studies, he worked briefly at a British merchant bank. In September 1981 he joined the audit and consulting firm Deloitte Haskins Sells. There he worked as a tax consultant, moving to the Corporate Tax Department of Deloitte upon qualifying as a chartered accountant. During this time he completed additional training at the Chartered Institute of Taxation.

In the spring of 1986, he built the Deloitte's Mergers and Acquisitions Group, a special department for corporate mergers and acquisitions, on. In May 1988 he left Deloitte Haskins Sells and together with his partner Hugo Haddon-Grant he founded Cavendish Corporate Finance LLP in the same month.

From 2000 to 2004 he was chair of the Faculty of Corporate Finance at the Institute of Chartered Accountants in England & Wales (ICAEW). In 2008 he received the "Outstanding Achievement in Corporate Finance Award" from the Faculty of Corporate Finance.

Since 1979, Lord Leigh supported the Conservative Party during election campaigns. [5] He was 2000–2005 Treasurer of the Conservative Party; He is since 2005 Alt-Treasurer (Senior Treasurer). [1] He is a member of the Executive Board of the Conservative Friends of Israel.

On 16 September 2013 he was elevated formally to Life Peer; he bears the title Baron Leigh of Hurley in the Royal County of Berkshire.

He was chairman and is currently President of Westminster Synagogue. On 11 July 2015 the Minister for Civil Society, Rob Wilson, appointed Lord Leigh to take part in a review of the self-regulation of fundraising of charities, which was published on 21 September 2015. Lord Leigh is Vice-President of the Jewish Leadership Council and the President of the Institute of Jewish Policy Research.

Lord Leigh is married to Jennifer Leigh and is father to two daughters. He is an occasional jogger and has participated in several national and local half marathons (including the Henley Standard 10 km and the Water of Life marathon). He lives alternately in London and Hurley.

External links 
 Lord Leigh of Hurley – House of Lords
 Howard Leigh –  Cavendish
 Howard Leigh – LinkedIn

References 

Conservative Party (UK) life peers
English accountants
1959 births
Living people
Alumni of the University of Southampton
English Jews
People educated at Clifton College
Life peers created by Elizabeth II